Pillon  may refer to:
 Pillon, Meuse, a commune in the Meuse department in Lorraine in north-eastern France
 Col du Pillon, a mountain pass in the western Swiss Alps
 Edmond Pillon (1891–1921), a French World War I flying ace credited with eight aerial victories
 François Pillon (1830–1914), a French philosopher
 Giuseppe Pillon (born 1956), an Italian football manager
 Jacqueline Pillon (born 1977), a Canadian actress